IdeaList was a commercially marketed free form text database application originally published by Blackwell Software, a division of Blackwell Science Ltd. The incomplete software source for version 4.0 was sold in the late 1990s to Bekon Marketing Ltd. who continued to develop the product up to version 5.5 before trading ceased.

IdeaList originated as a DOS program, later 16 bit and 32 bit versions were developed for Microsoft Windows and Macintosh computers. The software allowed complete textual documents to be entered into a database and had built in text retrieval (search) functions to allow rapid retrieval of documents. It featured script programming to allow it to carry out tasks such as printing to labels, envelopes or letters and was also capable of publishing standalone search-only databases.

References

External links 
Idealist Google Group

CHIC - Idealist in Museums

(abstract) Idealist for Windows 3.0 ISSN 1753-8548 EUP
Idealist for Windows User's Guide
Idealist for Macintosh User's Guide

Discontinued software
Bibliographic databases and indexes
Personal information managers